= Rolu Khedi =

- village
- Location within Madhya Pradesh Location within India
- Coordinates: 23.208300°N 77.308969°E
- Country: India
- State: Madhya Pradesh
- District: Bhopal
- Tehsil: Huzur

Population (2011)
  - Total: 45
- Time zone: UTC+5:30 (IST)
- ISO 3166 code: MP-IN
- Census code: 482511

Rolu Khedi is a village in the Bhopal district of Madhya Pradesh, India. It is located in the Huzur tehsil and the Phanda block.

== Demographics ==
According to the 2011 census of India, Rolu Khedi has 8 households. The effective literacy rate (i.e. the literacy rate of population excluding children aged 6 and below) is 66.67%.

Demographics (2011 Census)
	Total	Male	Female
Population	45	18	27
Children aged below 6 years	9	3	6
Scheduled caste	0	0	0
Scheduled tribe	12	4	8
Literates	24	9	15
Workers (all)	18	11	7
Main workers (total)	17	11	6
Main workers: Cultivators	4	3	1
Main workers: Agricultural labourers	13	8	5
Main workers: Household industry workers	0	0	0
Main workers: Other	0	0	0
Marginal workers (total)	1	0	1
Marginal workers: Cultivators	0	0	0
Marginal workers: Agricultural labourers	1	0	1
Marginal workers: Household industry workers	0	0	0
Marginal workers: Others	0	0	0
Non-workers	27	7	20
